Mega64 is a webseries, video production company and comedy troupe created by Rocco Botte, Derrick Acosta, and Shawn Chatfield, in 2003. Originally conceived to be a public-access television show, the original five episodes produced were later released on DVD as Mega64: Version 1 in 2004.

Since then, two further DVDs have been released (in 2006 and 2010 respectively) titled Version 2 and Version 3, with six episodes apiece. In addition to these, another two DVDs have been released, comprising sketches and commercials the production crew has created for various gaming companies and websites, including Ubisoft and IGN. Special editions of both Version 1 and Version 2 were released in 2008 and 2011 respectively.

In addition to video production, the Mega64 team host their own podcast, and are responsible for the Gamedays event at Disneyland, a now annual event started in 2010. The event serves as both a meet and greet for the crew and fans and as a popular event to explore the secrets of Disneyland, of which the Mega64 team are renowned fans.

Variety magazine named Mega64 as one of its "10 Comics to Watch for 2015".

Premise
In the not too distant future, a sinister scientist named Dr. Poque (Botte) creates the most powerful video game console ever assembled. Known as the 'Mega64', this device has the power to download classic and contemporary video games into the user's brain, causing them to take on a whole new reality.

Another character, named Sean, is initially hired by Dr. Poque as Rocko and Derek's "e-mail delivery man" but also starts taking part in the Mega64 experiments.

Two additional characters are later introduced: a puppet named Marcus (voiced by Chatfield), who is presumably working for Poque; and Horatio (Acosta), Poque's eccentric Mexican roommate.

History

Mega64 was originally produced to air on public-access television as a weekly tv-show; however, the original five episodes were not deemed to be suitable for broadcast. Later, creator Rocco Botte pitched the show to G4 but was rejected. Through the suggestion of Tommy Tallarico,  Botte decided to publish the material online.

Eventually, the show was released on DVD, published through Awful Video, the publishing arm of Something Awful.

The group received early exposure through video gaming magazines such as Electronic Gaming Monthly  and Nintendo Power.

Mega64: Version 200, the show's second season, was released on DVD on July 20, 2006. Mega64: Version 3 was originally meant to be released in 2008, but at their PAX 2008 panel, the team stated Version 3 would most likely not be finished until early 2009. Mega64: Version 3 went on sale May 28, 2010.

According to Mega64.com, British Sky Broadcasting was to air Mega64 Version 1 and Version 2 on one of their channels during their gaming block. However, in Mega64's Podcast: Episode 77, it was revealed Sky would not be airing Mega64, due to a misunderstanding between the two companies. In said podcast it was explained that British Sky Broadcasting had come under new management, and that Mega64s episodes being aired had been "lost in the shuffle". After contacting the company for the reasoning behind this, Sky representatives replied to Mega64 saying they "had asked too much money", however the Mega64 crew claims they did not ask for any amount of money.

The Mega64 cast and crew members are included in the game Super Scribblenauts as playable characters.

Rocco Botte was involved with the DVD release of the original Mighty Morphin' Power Rangers series. He was given a Special Thanks credit.

Episodes

Version 1 (first season)
Life Inside a Console
I Feel Asleep
Poque
The Gangs Returned to Class and Became Honor Students
Eyes of Skull Has a Secret

Version 2 (second season)
This Story is Happy End
Ode to Sue
And Suddenly, Ezra Didn't Feel So Alone Anymore
What the Hell Happened to Mega64?
Summer Semester
Stranger

Version 3 (third season)
Frankie
Bigger Boat
The Wizard 2
Mega64! (Musical episode)
Project Woosh
Delaware

Promotional skits

Ubisoft
For Ubisoft, the Mega64 team has produced skits featuring Tom Clancy's Splinter Cell: Chaos Theory, Cold Fear, 187 Ride or Die, Myst V: End of Ages, Prince of Persia: The Two Thrones, Dark Messiah of Might and Magic, Tom Clancy's Splinter Cell: Double Agent, and Tom Clancy's Rainbow Six Vegas 2, all of which have been available for download on their respective websites.

Skits featuring Tom Clancy's Ghost Recon Advanced Warfighter are available for download not only on the game's official website, but also via Xbox Live to Microsoft's Xbox 360, in full high-definition and Dolby 5.1 Surround, both firsts for Mega64. Both videos are now available, listed as "GRAW: Cross-Com 1" and "GRAW: Cross-Com 2".

Game Developers Conference
The Mega64 group have created several promotional skits for the Game Developers Conference, including advertisements for the conference and its Independent Games Festival, as well as comedic skits played during the conference's Game Developers Choice Awards. In 2008, the team released a series of advertisements for IGF, entitled "Intro", "I am Independent", and "Independent Inspirations". In 2010, they released another series of advertisements.

For the conference's Game Developers Choice Awards, the group regularly create comedic skits focusing on award recipients, which are premiered during the award ceremony. These include satirical accounts of Lifetime Achievement Award winners' careers, such as those of Ken Kutaragi in "Kutaragi's Way" and Hironobu Sakaguchi in "Sakaguchi's Final Fantasy".

Konami
In 2011, the Mega64 crew supplied a skit to Konami's E3 show, debuting the "transfarring" system in their upcoming Metal Gear Solid HD Collection. The system, which enables saved game data transfer between the PlayStation 3 and the PlayStation Vita, was presented as a solution to the problem of continuing game progress 'on the go', with Botte shown traversing public areas with a large, moving television and home console setup. The skit also revealed that the Metal Gear Solid HD Collection and the Zone of the Enders HD Collection would be released on the Xbox 360, in addition to the PlayStation 3.

On May 31 of 2012, Mega64 supplied a skit to Konami's Pre-E3 show as promotional material for their upcoming title Metal Gear Rising: Revengeance. The skit had the game's protagonist Raiden seeking jobs at an unemployment office after being fired due to an implied terrible economy, before eventually settling for Cybernetic Private Military Contractor, with Zone of the Enders Jehuty also trying to find a job in the last minutes of the skit.

For Konami's Pre-E3 show in 2013, the group supplied a skit advertising the game Castlevania: Lords of Shadow 2. The skit featured Botte performing a satirical take on the game's protagonist, Dracula.

Other promotional work
The group have also done promotional videos for the 2006 and 2007 Spike Video Game Awards that have aired on Spike TV.

The Mega64 team produced the music video for the Freezepop song "Brainpower".

In 2009, the group produced four commercials for GameTap, which aired on Adult Swim.

In 2012, Mega64 also produced faux commercials that appeared in The Aquabats! Super Show! on The Hub.

Nintendo enlisted Mega64 to produce promotional skits to reveal the company's E3 plans for 2014 and 2015.

In 2015, the Mega64 team created a promotional skit featuring Koji "IGA" Igarashi for his upcoming game and Kickstarter crowdfunding project, Bloodstained: Ritual of the Night. The skit is entitled "WORLD'S GREATEST VAMPIRE HUNTER".

Cast

 Rocco Botte – Dr. Poque, 'Rocko Boaty', Additional Characters
 Derrick Acosta – Derek Ackawzdha, Horatio, Additional Characters
 Shawn Chatfield – Sean Chatfeild, Marcus (voice)/Human Marcus, Chip Grip, Additional Characters

Additional cast
 Garrett Hunter – Garret: Leader of FALZ, Lobo Fuerte, Jessse The Man-Snake, DOWN Guardian, Blacks Guild Member, Additional Characters
 Chaz Baltezore Jr. – tr1gg3r s3r1ou5!!!!1 (Trigger Serious)
 Corey Springett – Vase Holder
 Craig Chatfield – Sombrero Guy
 Dallas McLaughlin – Boat Protector
 Dominic Botte – Dr.Jambo, Tourist, Church2 User, Additional Characters
 Duncan Roberts – The Specter (Version 1)
 Eric Baudour – Horatio pornography enthusiast, Dr. Poque's old coworker, Wizard seeker, King Burger King, unnamed FALZ Member
 Evan Morrison – Thug
 Fernando Jay Huerto – FALZ Enforcer
 Frank Howley – Wizard Seeker, HAT Trooper, Audience Member
 Hawley Laterza – Gruntilda
 Jennifer Jensen – Herself
 Jennie Gates – Amber (aka, "Amber from High School")
 Jenny Luckey – Sue
 John Wanser – Jon, Terminator2 Watcher
 Jon Allen – Kain (voice only, Version 1)
 Jonathan Rohrbacher – Benny, Tony, Shu From China
 Josh Brashars - Kain, FALZ Recruiter (Version 2)
 Josh Elwell – Teddy Beans
 Josh Jones – Dr. Poque's old colleague
 Kevin Bowen – Dr. Poque's old boss
 Kevin "Sparky" Bushong - Unnamed FALZ member
 Kevin Castaneda – Rick
 Kevin Smith – Himself
 Krista Chatfield – The "True Form" of the Virus
 Kyle Hebert – Wanser (voice)
 Laura Loza – The "Romantic Interest"/The Blacks' Hostage
 Leroy Patterson – Salt Guy
 Luke Chatfield – Thark the Man-Possum, Blacks Guild Leader, The Specter (Version 2), unnamed FALZ member, Additional Characters
 Margie Acosta – Horatio's Mom
 Matthew Lopez – Future Dude
 Michael J. Nelson – Frankie (Human Form)
 Nicole Crakes – Happy Program Girl, Gorilla, Yorda, Nicole
 Paul Schrier – Paul Farkas
 Richard Botte – Danny America, Drug-Addicted Dad
 Ricky Fitness – Ricky "Thumbs" Jackson
 Ryan Sinn – Test subject
 Sean Legerton – "Sean" (he's nameless in the dialogue)
 Rocco Matusic – FIRED
 Tommy Tallarico – Hairy Gary the Feral Child, Himself
 Tim Heidecker and Eric Wareheim – as The Mega64 Ragtime Jug Brotherz

Famous guest stars
 Cliff Bleszinski – Himself, Additional Characters
 Mega64: Metal Gear Solid 4 (HD)
 HOW SHENMUE WAS MEANT TO END
 SAVE GAMESTOP
 Warren Spector Tribute
 KUTARAGI'S WAY
 SAKAGUCHI'S FINAL FANTASY
 THE NEW UNREAL ENGINE
 Brandon DiCamillo – John Madden
 Mega64: MADDEN RAP 2012 (ft. Brandon DiCamillo)
 Dan Paladin – Himself, Falz member
 Mega64: GDC 2008 IGF Awards Intro
 IF YOU'RE NOT INDIE, F**K YOU
 Hideo Kojima – Himself
 Mega64: Metal Gear Solid 4 (HD)
 Sequence Erase
 Mega64: Death Stranding Behind The Scenes
 Shigeru Miyamoto – Himself
 Mega64: New Super Mario Bros.
 Gabe Newell – Himself, Ringo Starr
 Mega64: The Beatles Rock Band
 Yu Suzuki – Himself
 HOW SHENMUE WAS MEANT TO END
 Ken Kutaragi – Himself/Nintendo exec
 KUTARAGI'S WAY
 Reggie Fils-Aime – Himself/The Reggie Fils-A-Mech
 MEGA64 INFILTRATES NINTENDO
 REGGIE GOES FOR THE GOLD
 Hironobu Sakaguchi – Himself
 SAKAGUCHI'S FINAL FANTASY
 IGA – Vampire hunter
 WORLD'S GREATEST VAMPIRE HUNTER
 Fumito Ueda - Himself
 Fumito Ueda's MADDEN 2018
 Tim Sweeney - Himself
 THE NEW UNREAL ENGINE
 Toshihiro Nagoshi - Himself
 Judgment (OFFICIAL)
 Hideki Kamiya - Himself
 Mega64 Was BLOCKED By Hideki Kamiya

Crew
 Rocco Botte – Co-creator, Writer, Producer, Glasses
 Derrick Acosta – Co-creator, Writer, Moustache
 Shawn Chatfield – Writer, Chip Grip, Beard
 Garrett Hunter – Makeup, Effects (Version 2 & 3), Writer (Version 3), Dreads
 Ian Luckey – Composer (Version 1)
 Josh Jones – Composer (Version 2, 3, and 4.1)
 Richard Kyanka – Producer (Version 1 & 2)
 The Aquabats – Additional Music (Version 1, 2, & 3)
 Freezepop – Additional Music (Version 2 & 3)
 Vanessa Luckey – Link Costume (Version 1: "Eyes of Skull Has a Secret")
 Shmorky – Version 2 Opening Animation, Gnome Animation (Ghost Recon Ad #2)
 Mariel Cartwright – Version 2 Menu Artwork, Version 3 DVD Cover Art
 Iain Stasukevich – Director of Photography, "What the Hell Happened to Mega 64?"
 Evan Morrison''' – Grip, "What The Hell Happened to Mega 64?"

Podcast
Currently available through Twitch and YouTube, a podcast consisting of the Mega64 crew and various guests is released every Tuesday. The podcast premiered September 25, 2006. At first, it was only available in audio format, but since December 24, 2007, it has also been in video format. Since its launch, the video podcast has been featured as Mega64's main podcast, while the audio podcasts are audio extractions of the video counterparts. This is often referred to in the video podcast, with hosts or guests sometimes describing things that are happening for those who are listening to the audio-only version. As of January 11, 2009, the video podcast has been live streamed, first on Ustream and then on Twitch, every Sunday at 6pm PST.

The podcast is usually recorded at the Mega64 studio, but the Mega64 crew has also been known to record podcasts in different locations. For example, the February 12, 2008 podcast was filmed at Disneyland, with much of the discussion taking place on Disneyland attractions. Subsequent podcasts have been filmed in San Francisco, Las Vegas, Toronto, and the home of Tommy Tallarico.

On September 26, 2011, animator Hotdiggedydemon (Max Gilardi) and Mega64 teamed up to make animated cartoons of the podcast for 6 weeks called Mega64nimation''.

References

External links

 
 

Fictional video games
American comedy web series
Video podcasts
Video game podcasts
Comedy and humor podcasts
American comedy troupes
Sketch comedy troupes
Black comedy
2006 podcast debuts
Parodies of video games